Soeva is a village in Audru Parish, Pärnu County, in southwestern Estonia. It has a population of 77 (as of 1 January 2011).

Most of the village's territory is occupied by the Nätsi-Võlla Nature Reserve. The settlement itself is located by the Pärnu–Lihula road (nr. 60).

References

Villages in Pärnu County